Fiona Barbouttis Martin (born 16 November 1977) is a former Australian Liberal Party politician who was elected as Member of Parliament for Reid at the 2019 federal election. She lost her seat to Labor MP Sally Sitou at the 2022 federal election after a single term in office.

Early years and background
Martin is the daughter of Kathleen and George Barbouttis. Her parents and maternal grandparents were born in Australia, while her paternal grandparents were Greek migrants to Australia from the island of Kastellorizo. Martin grew up in Campsie, Earlwood and Concord West, attending Santa Sabina College in Strathfield and then Rosebank College in Five Dock.

Martin graduated from the University of Sydney with a doctorate in psychology, and owned a psychology practice that has rooms in Mosman and Gladesville. Her PhD thesis was titled "Self-understanding in high-functioning males with autism spectrum disorders: relationship with social functioning and theory of mind".

Political career
In mid-March 2019, the then member for Reid Craig Laundy announced that he would not be standing at the 2019 election.
 
Early the following month, Martin was nominated for the seat by the Liberal Party, being described as a "captain's pick" of Prime Minister Scott Morrison,
 
and she subsequently won the seat at the 2019 federal election.

 
From 2019 to the 2022 Australian federal election, Reid was the federal coalition government's most marginal seat in NSW.

Martin is a member of the Moderate/Modern Liberal faction of the Liberal Party.

On 10 February 2022, Martin crossed the floor with four other Liberal MPs to include protection for transgender students in the government's modifications to the Sex Discrimination Act.

In April 2022, The Australian published accusations against Martin, including that she allegedly employed a former babysitter in a taxpayer-funded role worth up to $90,000 a year despite them having no political experience, and that her office allegedly experienced ‘a mass exodus of 15 staff members’ from 2019 to 2022.

On 11 May 2022, Martin participated in a debate with the Labor candidate for Reid Sally Sitou, during the debate Martin accused Sitou of failing to win preselection in Fowler. This led to criticism of Martin as she appeared to confuse Sitou who is Asian-Australian with Tu Le, who failed to win preselection in Fowler. Martin denies that she mixed the two up.

Days after Martin’s defeat it was revealed that she was the only defeated Liberal Party MP that Scott Morrison did not call to offer his condolences. Martin said that she ‘got the sense he (Morrison) wanted me gone.’ Martin also speculated that it was either ‘Morrison’s (factional) camp’ or ‘conservative branches’ that leaked details of her office turnover to the conservative press, which she described as a ‘hit job.’

Personal life

Martin is married to Nicolai Clausen, who was a Danish citizen at the time of their marriage. Martin has four children.

She lives with her family in Ryde.

Martin was one of eleven MPs in the 46th Parliament of Australia who possessed a PhD, the others being Katie Allen, Jim Chalmers, Anne Aly, Andrew Leigh, Daniel Mulino, Jess Walsh, Adam Bandt, Mehreen Faruqi, Anne Webster and Helen Haines.

See also
Members of the Australian House of Representatives: 2019–2022
 Electoral results for the Division of Reid 2019

References

1977 births
Living people
Liberal Party of Australia members of the Parliament of Australia
Politicians from Sydney
University of Sydney alumni
Members of the Australian House of Representatives for Reid
Members of the Australian House of Representatives
Women members of the Australian House of Representatives
Australian people of Greek descent
Australian psychologists
Australian women psychologists
21st-century Australian politicians
21st-century Australian women politicians